A shootout, also called a firefight, gunfight, or gun battle, is a combat situation between armed parties using guns. The term can be used to describe any such fight, though it is typically used in a non-military context or to describe combat situations primarily using firearms (generally excluding crew-served weapons, combat vehicles, armed aircraft, or explosives).

Shootouts often pit law enforcement against criminals, though they can also involve groups outside of law enforcement, such as rivalling gangs, militias, or individuals. Military combat situations are rarely called "shootouts", and are almost always considered battles, engagements, or skirmishes.

Shootouts are often depicted in action films, Westerns, and video games.

Notable shootouts in the United States and territories

Gunfight at the O.K. Corral

On October 26, 1881, Deputy U.S. Marshal and Tombstone City Marshal Virgil Earp, Assistant Marshal Morgan Earp, and Special Police Officers Wyatt Earp and Doc Holliday, faced off against outlaw Cowboys Ike Clanton, Billy Clanton, Billy Claiborne, Tom McLaury, and Frank McLaury in Tombstone, Arizona Territory.

Frisco shootout

On December 1, 1884, lawman Elfego Baca ignited an intense shootout with 40-80 cowboys, depending on the source, in Frisco (now Reserve), New Mexico.

Battle of Matewan, West Virginia

On May 19, 1920, private agents from the Baldwin–Felts Detective Agency battled with the local sheriff, the town's mayor, and a group of coal miners, over an attempt by Baldwin-Felts agents to evict coal miners from their homes during a strike.

Kansas City massacre

On June 17, 1933, in an attempt to free their friend, a criminal gang ambushed seven FBI agents and Kansas City police at the train station as they were escorting captured fugitive Frank Nash back to prison. The FBI agents were unarmed, but the local police exchanged fire with the criminal gang. The gang unintentionally killed Nash along with the law officers.

The FBI claimed that the gang included Charles "Pretty Boy" Floyd, but the evidence is debatable and contradicts with Floyd's alleged presence.

Battle of Barrington

On November 27, 1934, in Barrington, Illinois, bank robber Lester Gillis/George "Baby Face" Nelson, his wife Helen, and gang member John Chase encountered an FBI car driven by Agents Thomas Dade and William Ryan on a highway outside Barrington. Nelson pursued the FBI agents, exchanging gunfire with them, until his car was disabled. Two more agents, Special Agent Herman "Ed" Hollis and Inspector Sam Cowley, arrived on the scene and engaged Nelson and Chase in a shootout. Though Nelson was wounded seventeen times by the agents, he and Chase were able to fatally injure both Hollis and Cowley. Nelson escaped, only to die that evening from his injuries.

Truman assassination attempt

On November 1, 1950, Puerto Rican nationalists Oscar Collazo and Griselio Torresola engaged in a shootout with officers of the Capitol Police and Secret Service while attempting to break into the Blair House and assassinate President Harry Truman. By the end of the gun battle, Torresola and officer Leslie Coffelt were killed in an event that firearms instructor Massad Ayoob called "the boldest attempt at home invasion in modern history".

Austin Tower sniper

On August 1, 1966, Charles Whitman barricaded himself at the top of the tower at the University of Texas at Austin and proceeded to fire randomly from the tower. He then exchanged fire with Austin Police Department officers and armed civilians. After killing several people, he was killed in a final exchange when his perch was stormed by Austin police.

Newhall massacre

On April 6, 1970, California Highway Patrol (CHP) officers engaged heavily armed criminals Bobby Davis and Jack Twinning in a shootout in the parking lot of a restaurant near Newhall, California. In a span of five minutes, Davis and Twinning killed four CHP officers, making it the deadliest day in the history of Californian law enforcement.

Davis was later arrested, while Twinning killed himself following a long standoff with police.

Marin County Courthouse shootout

On August 7, 1970, in an attempt to free his brother, imprisoned Black Panther leader George Jackson, 17-year-old Jonathan Jackson entered a courthouse in Marin County, California with an arsenal of weapons. After storming into a room where a trial was taking place, Jackson armed defendant James McClain, who was on trial for murdering a prison guard, and two fellow convicts who were participating in the trial as witnesses, William Christmas and Ruchell Magee. The four armed men then took the judge, a district attorney and three jurors hostage, and marched them out of the courthouse into a waiting getaway van.

As they attempted to flee the scene, a shootout broke out between the hostage takers and Marin County Sheriffs deputies providing security at the courthouse. By the end of the gun battle, Jonathan Jackson, McClain, Christmas, and judge Harold Haley were killed. According to the other hostages, Haley was executed by the hostage takers with a shotgun that had been taped to his throat. Magee was severely injured, but survived the battle and was sentenced to life in prison. One juror and the D.A. were also wounded. One of the weapons used by Jackson was later traced to Black Panther icon Angela Davis, who was later tried (but acquitted) for participation in the crime. It was later alleged by a Marin General Hospital doctor that Judge Haley was being treated for a brain tumor and should have been recused from trying cases for health reasons.

Symbionese Liberation Army (SLA) shootout

On May 17, 1974, a confrontation and gun battle occurred between officers of the Los Angeles Police Department (LAPD) and six members of the Symbionese Liberation Army at a residential home at 1466 East 54th Street, Los Angeles.

This remains one of the largest police shootouts in history with a reported total of over 9,000 rounds being fired (5,000 by police, 4,000 by the SLA). Every round fired by SLA members at the police missed the officers. During the incident, police fired tear gas into the house, unintentionally starting a fire. All six SLA members were killed, either by police bullets or the fire. The SLA's leader, Donald DeFreeze, committed suicide.

MOVE

On May 13, 1985, the Philadelphia Police Department engaged in a shootout with the anarcho-primitivist group MOVE, after a failed attempt to serve arrest warrants on four members of the group at their communal residence. About 10,000 rounds of ammunition were fired by the police. The police eventually dropped two bombs on the house from a police helicopter, starting a fire which burned down 62 houses and killed 11 people.

Norco bank robbery shootout

On May 9, 1980, a bank robbery led to a prolonged shootout and chase between police in Norco, California, and five heavily armed bank robbers wearing military-style fatigues and armed with semi-automatic rifles and thousands of rounds of hollow-point bullets as well as various explosive and incendiary devices.

Police responded to a bank robbery call in Norco. Upon arriving the police were ambushed and outgunned. After the robbers unloaded over 300 rounds at police cruisers, the officers were forced to retreat behind their cruisers or nearby obstacles, all the while being fired upon. The suspects attempted to escape in their own vehicle. During this attempt, the driver of the suspects was killed by a stray police shot. The suspects then hijacked a nearby vehicle and became involved in a prolonged chase, in which the suspects shot at police and disabled and destroyed 33 police vehicles (as well as civilian cars) with explosives thrown from the back of a truck. The suspects also disabled a police helicopter by shooting at it. Later, the suspects lay in wait for police as they chased them, and ambushed them, resulting in the death of a police officer and wounding two others. Heavily outgunned, the police were pinned down until one officer arrived with an AR-15 carbine. After the police engaged the suspects with the AR-15, the suspects fled. One of the suspects was killed in the shootout, one during a later standoff with the police the next day, and three were later captured. Eight officers were also wounded during the events.

Brink's armored truck robbery

On October 20, 1981, an attempted armed robbery of a Brinks armored truck by members of the Weather Underground and Black Liberation Army resulted in a shootout and the deaths of two police officers and a Brinks security guard in Nyack, New York. The robbers, wearing body armor and equipped with assault rifles, initially ambushed the armored truck when it was parked at a shopping mall, killing Brinks guard Pete Paige and wounding his partner. After taking $1.6 million in cash and attempting to flee in a U-Haul truck, they were stopped at a roadblock set up by police. In a second shootout, police officers Waverly Brown and Ed O'Grady were killed and the robbers fled the scene in several different directions. Four of the robbers were arrested during their escape attempt, and more than six other people involved were arrested in subsequent investigations over the next several years. The last arrest was made in 1986.

Shannon Street massacre

On January 11, 1983, Memphis Police Department Officer Bobby Hester was taken hostage at a house at 2239 Shannon Street after a confrontation occurred between Hester, his partner Ray Schwill, and the house's owner, cult leader Lindberg Sanders. After 30 hours of negotiations, a Memphis Police assault team raided the house, killing Sanders and six of his followers, after which they found the body of Hester beaten to death.

FBI Miami shootout

On April 11, 1986, two FBI agents and two suspects were killed in a prolonged and intense firefight between the FBI and bank-robbery suspects William Matix and Michael Platt in Miami, Florida. The event became one of the most famous shootouts in American history, with ten participants (eight FBI agents and two suspects), roughly 145 rounds fired, and four deaths. Even though the FBI agents outnumbered the suspects four to one, the agents were outgunned by the suspects. It took a total of 18 hits (six on Matix, 12 on Platt) to bring the gun battle to an end. All but one of the FBI agents involved in the shootout were killed or wounded.

Ruby Ridge

In a 11-day siege in August 1992, agents of the ATF, FBI, and U.S. Marshals armed engaged in a shootout with survivalist Randy Weaver and his family in the wilderness near Bonners Ferry, Idaho.

Branch Davidian siege

On February 28, 1993, heavily armed members of the Branch Davidian sect engaged federal agents of the ATF in an intense firefight during a raid of their compound building, initiating a 51-day siege by the FBI near Waco, Texas.

North Hollywood shootout

On February 28, 1997, following a failed bank robbery in North Hollywood, Los Angeles, California, the two robbers, Larry Phillips, Jr. and Emil Mătăsăreanu, armed with several assault rifles, fired upon responding officers of the Los Angeles Police Department. The ensuing firefight lasted 44 minutes, with more than 2000 rounds fired collectively from both sides. The only deaths were the two bank robbers, Phillips and Mătăsăreanu. Twelve police officers and eight civilians were injured.

Columbine High School massacre

On April 20, 1999, school shooters Eric Harris and Dylan Klebold exchanged fire with Denver Police Department officers three times. Although 12 students and one teacher died, 21 others were injured and both the shooters committed suicide, no officers were killed or injured.

Tyler courthouse shootout

On February 24, 2005, David Hernandez Arroyo attacked his ex-wife, Maribel Estrada, and her son outside the courthouse in Tyler, Texas. Arroyo was armed with a semi-automatic MAK-90 (AK-47 clone with a semi-automatic receiver) rifle. Maribel Estrada was shot in the head and died; her son was shot in the leg but recovered. The shots immediately brought a response from nearby sheriff's deputies and Tyler Police. Arroyo began trading gunfire with the officers, who were armed only with pistols, and forced them to retreat, wounding several of them. A passing civilian, Mark Allen Wilson, drew his own pistol and attempted to aid the officers but Arroyo was wearing body armor and Wilson's pistol failed to stop him; Wilson was shot and killed by Arroyo. Afterward, Arroyo jumped in his pickup and led police on a high-speed chase, exchanging gunfire along the way. Arroyo was eventually shot and killed by a responding officer armed with a CAR-15 rifle.

Pittsburgh police shootings

A shootout occurred on April 4, 2009, at 1016 Fairfield Street in the Stanton Heights neighborhood of Pittsburgh, Pennsylvania, stemming from an argument over a dog urinating in the house between a mother and her 22-year-old son. At approximately 7:11 a.m. EDT, 22-year-old Richard Poplawski opened fire on two Pittsburgh Police officers responding to a 911 call from Poplawski's mother, who was attempting to get the police officers to remove her son from the home. Three police officers were ultimately confirmed dead, and another two were seriously injured. Poplawski was armed with a semi-automatic AK-47-style rifle and two other guns, protected by a bulletproof vest, and had been lying in wait for the officers. According to police and witnesses, he held police at bay for four hours as the fallen officers were left bleeding nearby, their colleagues unable to reach them. More than 100 rounds were fired by the SWAT teams and Poplawski, who surrendered after suffering a gunshot wound to the leg. Poplawski was later convicted of capital murder and was sentenced to death.

Lakewood police officer shooting

On Sunday, November 29, 2009, four Lakewood, Washington police officers (Sergeant Mark Renninger, Officer Ronald Owens, 37, Officer Tina Griswold, 40, Officer Greg Richards, 42) were shot and killed at a coffee shop in the Parkland unincorporated area of Pierce County, Washington. One gunman (Maurice Clemmons) entered the coffee shop and fired at the officers as they sat working on their laptop computers. One of the officers returned fire before being killed, wounding Clemmons, but he was still able to flee the scene. After a 2-day manhunt that spanned several cities in the Puget Sound region, Clemmons was shot and killed by a Seattle Police Department officer in south Seattle.

Christopher Dorner shootings and manhunt

From February 3–12, 2013, former LAPD officer Christopher Dorner killed three people (including an officer) and injured three other officers. On February 12, Dorner engaged in a shootout with police at Big Bear Lake, California, killing one and injuring another. Police then deployed tear gas into Dorner's cabin, which possibly set it on fire, after which Dorner committed suicide.

Twin Peaks shootout

On May 17, 2015, in one of the deadliest gang shootings in American history, a brawl between rival biker gangs in front of a Twin Peaks restaurant in Waco, Texas escalated into a shootout between rival gangs as well as police. Nine people were killed and 18 others were injured.

Umpqua Community College shooting

On October 1, 2015, after killing nine civilians and injuring nine others at Umpqua Community College near Roseburg, Oregon, shooter Christopher Harper Mercer engaged in a shootout with responding police officers before killing himself.

Dallas shootings

On July 7, 2016, enraged by the shootings of black men Alton Sterling and Philando Castile by police in Louisiana and Minnesota, Micah Xavier Johnson opened fire on white police officers of the Dallas Police Department from an upper floor of a parking garage whilst they were overseeing a protest. Johnson was killed by a Remotec ANDROS Mark V-A bomb disposal robot, which carried a pound of C-4 explosive.

St. Joseph Courthouse Shooting

On July 11, 2016, inmate Larry Darnell Gordon opened fire on the third floor of the Berrien County Courthouse in St. Joseph, Michigan, killing two bailiffs and injuring a sheriff's deputy. Gordon, who was facing a multitude of charges that carried a possible life sentence, was being taken to a holding cell following a courthouse hearing when he disarmed an officer and attempted to take hostages. Moments after taking hostages, other court officers shot and killed Gordon.

2019 Miramar shootout

On December 5, 2019, the Miami-Dade Police Department engaged in a shootout with jewelry store robbers at a busy intersection.

2021 Sunrise shootout

On February 2, 2021, FBI agents served a search warrant on a house of suspect who was suspected of abusing minors. The suspect ambushed the FBI agents, shooting five agents, two of whom were mortally wounded. The suspect was killed on the scene.

Other notable shootouts

Beer Hall Putsch

On November 9, 1923, Adolf Hitler and at least 2,000 members of the Nazi Party, which Hitler belonged to, attempted to launch a coup in Munich, Weimar Republic. The resulting shootout between Bavarian Police and Nazi supporters left twenty people dead and many injured.

Battle of Bamber Bridge

In the early hours of 25 June 1943, tensions between black troops and white military police stationed in Bamber Bridge, Lancashire, England, flared into mutiny, with both sides shooting at each other in the middle of the town. The "Battle of Bamber Bridge" was one of the few instances of a gun battle in the United Kingdom during World War II, and left one dead and four wounded.

Milperra massacre

On 2 September (Father's Day in Australia) 1984, rival motorcycle gang members engaged in a firearm battle in Milperra, a south-western suburb of Sydney, New South Wales, Australia. The shootout had its roots in an intense rivalry that developed after a group of Comancheros broke away and formed the first Bandidos Motorcycle Club chapter in Australia. Seven people were killed and twenty-eight injured when the two groups clashed at Milperra. The event was a catalyst for significant changes to gun laws in New South Wales.

David Malcolm Gray

On 14 November 1990, after a shooting rampage which killed up to 13 people (including a police officer) in the small seaside township of Aramoana, New Zealand, members of the Special Tactics Group (STG) surrounded the house where shooter David Malcolm Gray was hiding and a gunbattle took place after failed attempts to lure him out. At the end, Gray ran out of the house, firing his rifle from the hip before being shot by STG officers. Gra.

1991 Lokhandwala Complex shootout

On November 16, 1991, Additional Commissioner of Police Aftab Ahmed Khan, head of the Anti-Terrorism Squad (ATS), led a force of almost 100 police and ATS officers and attacked the Swati building at the Lokhandwala Complex in Bombay, India. In the ensuing four-hour shootout, 450 rounds were fired and seven D-Company gangsters were killed, including Maya Dolas, Dilip Buwa, and Anil Pawar.

Mayerthorpe incident

On March 3, 2005, James Roszko ambushed and killed Royal Canadian Mounted Police constables Peter Schiemann, Anthony Gordon, Lionide Johnston and Brock Myrol with a prohibited HK-91 rifle during a stake-out in Mayerthorpe, Alberta, Canada. The resulting  shootout with other present RCMP officers came to an end when Roszko committed suicide after being wounded.

Spiritwood incident

On July 7, 2006, Constables Robin Cameron and Marc Bourdages of the Royal Canadian Mounted Police were both shot in the head through the windshield of their cruiser after a 27 km car chase and shootout with Curtis Dagenais in rural Saskatchewan.

Mumbai massacre

On November 26, 2008, 10 members of the Pakistani militant group Lashkar-e-Taiba carried out shooting sprees at several different locations throughout the Indian city of Mumbai, India. The terrorists, heavily armed with automatic weapons and explosives, overwhelmed the initial response from lightly-armed and minimally-trained police and held out for nearly three days, inflicting almost 500 casualties, with 157 deaths (including 17 police officers and soldiers). 9 of the 10 attackers were killed, while the 10th was arrested and later executed.

Manila hostage crisis

On 23 August 2010, in Rizal Park, Manila, Philippines, former police officer Rolando Mendoza boarded a bus carrying tourists from Hong Kong and took the occupants hostage. After freeing four children, senior citizens, and a disabled woman, the shootout began after the on-board TV broadcast showing the arrest of his younger brother. Enraged, Mendoza took the tour guide and shot him in the head at the door. After two hours, a police sniper shot and killed Mendoza. The assault killed eight hostages (the youngest being 14), and wounded seven hostages, one journalist, and one bystander.

2013 Annaberg shooting

On 16 September 2013, Austrian federal police received a call about a suspected poacher in the woods. Police officers sought to inspect the vehicle of 55-year-old Alois Huber, but he sped off upon spotting them and later crashed his car in a ditch near Annaberg, Lower Austria. Huber then proceeded on foot and shot two police officers posted near a checkpoint in Annaberg. A Red Cross paramedic was also shot while providing aid to the wounded. One of the officers and the paramedic later died in the hospital, while the other officer survived his wounds. At another checkpoint, Huber shot and killed another officer while taking a fourth hostage. He then stole a police car and drove it to his farmhouse near Melk. Austrian Armed Forces assisted in the manhunt with soldiers and armoured vehicles.

2015 Île-de-France attacks

Between 7–9 January 2015, three AQAP terrorists, brothers Chérif and Saïd Kouachi and Amedy Coulibaly, committed a series of five attacks that resulted in the deaths in 20 people, including themselves. The Kouachis killed two police officers during the Charlie Hebdo shooting on 7 January before fleeing. Coulibaly shot and killed a policewoman the next day. Finally on 9 January, the Kouachis and Coulibaly held separate sieges which resulted in shootouts with police and all three being killed.

Saint-Denis raid

On 18 November 2015, five days after the November 2015 Paris attacks, in Saint-Denis, Seine-Saint-Denis, France, French police raided an apartment that thought to be housing the mastermind behind the attacks, Abdelhamid Abaaoud. Following a seven-hour shootout in which police fired over 5,000 rounds of ammunition, Abaaoud, his cousin Hasna Aït Boulahcen, and fellow Paris attacker Chakib Akrouh were killed and 5 terrorists were arrested.

2022 Saanich shootout

On 28 June 2022, twin brothers Mathew and Isaac Auchterlonie engaged in a shootout with police in Saanich, British Columbia, Canada after an attempted bank robbery at a Bank of Montreal branch. The brothers had developed a strong disdain for police, especially after federal firearms restriction legislation was announced, and deliberately orchestrated the robbery to attack responding officers. Six officers were wounded and both suspects were killed after an exchange with a Victoria Police Department tactical team.

See also 
List of hostage crises
Standoff
Cordon and search
Encounter killings by police

References

Gangland warfare tactics
Law enforcement
Violent crime
Combat
Violence
Western (genre) staples and terminology